"So Wat Cha Sayin'" is the first single released from, EPMD's second album, Unfinished Business. Produced by EPMD with scratches provided by DJ Scratch, "So Wat Cha Sayin'" made it to three Billboard charts, peaking at #5 on the Hot Rap Singles. The video was directed by Adam Bernstein, who previously directed EPMD's 1988 video for "You Gots to Chill".

In 2001, Beanie Sigel & Memphis Bleek did a cover version of this song on a song of the same name on Beanie Sigel's The Reason (Beanie Sigel album) album with Beanie covering Erick Sermon's verses & Bleek covering Parrish Smith's verses.

Single track listing
"So Wat Cha Sayin'" (Club Version)- 4:55  
"So Wat Cha Sayin'" (Dub Version)- 4:53  
"So Wat Cha Sayin'" (Radio Version)- 3:45

Charts

References

1989 singles
EPMD songs
Songs written by Erick Sermon
1989 songs
Songs written by PMD (rapper)